The Winter Garden Atrium is a 120-foot (36.6 m) tall 10-story glass-vaulted pavilion on Vesey Street in New York City's Brookfield Place (formerly World Financial Center) office complex. Designed by Diana Balmori, the Atrium was originally constructed in 1988, and substantially rebuilt in 2002, after it was damaged by the collapse of the World Trade Center during the September 11 attacks. The Atrium houses various plants, trees, flowers, and shops. The rear of the building opens onto the World Financial Center Plaza and the North Cove Yacht Harbor on the Hudson River. Over the years, the Atrium has become home to various exhibits and holiday displays.

History
The Winter Garden Atrium, along with the rest of the World Financial Center, was designed by architect César Pelli in 1985. It was inaugurated on October 14, 1988 and had a total cost of $60 million. The Atrium was originally connected to the World Trade Center via a  pedestrian bridge that spanned West Street.

It was severely damaged in the September 11, 2001 attacks as almost all the glass panes were blown out by the dust clouds and debris caused by the collapse of the World Trade Center, but was rebuilt during the first year of the Financial Center's recovery.  Reconstruction of the Winter Garden required 2,000 panes of glass, 60,000 square feet (5,400 m²) of marble flooring and stairs, and sixteen  Washingtonia robusta palm trees at a cost of $50 million. Reopened on September 17, 2002, the Winter Garden was the first major structure to be completely restored following the attacks. President George W. Bush was present at the reopening ceremony.

The pedestrian bridge was destroyed in the same attacks and was replaced by windows facing the former site of the World Trade Center.

Exhibits
Since its construction, the Winter Garden Atrium has hosted concerts and symphonies as part of the World Financial Center Series. Upon its reopening in 2002, the atrium held ballets, concerts, a performance by the Big Apple Circus, and a production of The Downtown Messiah, a modern interpretation of Handel's classical oratorio, directed by Richard Barone.

In early 2003, the Lower Manhattan Development Corporation installed an exhibit documenting the recovery process of the World Trade Center in the atrium. The exhibit included early designs of Libeskind's Freedom Tower. Later that year, the eight finalists in the competition for the new buildings had their designs unveiled and displayed in the atrium.

The Winter Garden continues to serve as a venue for art exhibits, music, and shows, as well as hosting movie screenings during the TriBeCa Film Festival.

Luminaries 
In 2015, designer David Rockwell was commissioned to design a holiday display for the Winter Garden. Drawing inspiration from the festive Rockefeller Center Christmas Tree, he created the "Luminaries", an interactive installation of 650 lanterns that hang from the ceiling of the Winter Garden. At the beginning of every hour between 8 AM and 10 PM, the Luminaries displayed a special light show featuring one of the following songs: Winter Wonderland by Michael Búble, Silver Bells by Tony Bennett, Carol of the Bells by The Bird and The Bee, and Let It Snow by Pentatonix. Outside of the light show, visitors would be able to change the colors of these lanterns at the 'wishing station', which consists of three touch-sensitive cubes that control the lights. For each visitor interaction, Brookfield made a $1 donation, up to $25,000, to Outreach, an organization that helps support youth struggling with substance abuse.

Winter Biergarten 
In 2018, the Winter Garden transformed into a Winter Biergarten while hosting 5 Borough Challenge: Best Brews of NYC every Thursday from February 22nd to March 15th. Each night, guests were able to sample brews from five breweries, one from each of the five boroughs. While tasting these samples, they could play games, listen to music, and cast a vote for their favorite brewery. Breweries featured included globally-renowned ones such as Brooklyn Brewery and less-known ones such as Kills Boro Brewing Company. The event was held in partnership with New Yorkers for Parks, a non-profit organization dedicated to building and protecting open spaces throughout New York City. A total of $46,000 was raised from the beer sales by the end of the multi-week event, and 100% of these proceeds went to New Yorkers for Parks.

A Dozen Dreams 
In 2021, the Winter Garden was home to "A Dozen Dreams", an immersive art installation commissioned by En Garde Arts. They asked 12 female playwrights to describe their dreams during the pandemic. Artistic director Anne Hamburger, along with former director John Clinton Eisner and designer Irina Kruzhilina, then brought these descriptions to life in twelve separate rooms. At the entrance of the installation, visitors were given headphones to listen to recorded audio descriptions of the dreams written and performed by the playwrights themselves. Each of these recordings was 3 minutes and 30 seconds long, and visitors were allowed to move at their own pace. In December 2021, the exhibit was featured in New York Times' "Best Theater of 2021".

Gallery

See also 

 World Trade Center
 Brookfield Place (New York City)

References

External links 

 Calendar of Events

Brookfield Place (New York City)
World Trade Center
César Pelli buildings
Buildings and structures completed in 1988
Buildings and structures in Manhattan
History of New York City
Buildings and structures destroyed in the September 11 attacks
Aftermath of the September 11 attacks
Event venues established in 1985
1988 establishments in New York City